Mukkamala is a village in Peravali Mandal of West Godavari district, Andhra Pradesh, India.

Demographics 

 Census of India, Mukkamala had a population of 5128. The total population constitute, 2599 males and 2529 females with a sex ratio of 973 females per 1000 males. 463 children are in the age group of 0–6 years, with sex ratio of 1067. The average literacy rate stands at 72.33%.

References

Villages in West Godavari district